This article shows all participating women's volleyball squads at the 2010 Central American and Caribbean Games, held from July 18 to July 29, 2010 in Mayagüez, Puerto Rico.

Head Coach: Andrew Brathwaite

Head Coach: Braulio Godínez

Head Coach: Marcos Kwiek

Head Coach: Leivys García

Head Coach: José A. Bernal

Head Coach: René Quintana

Head Coach: Carlos Cardona

Head Coach: Francisco Cruz Jiménez

External links
 NORCECA Mayagüez 2010

C
Women's Squads, 2010 Central American And Caribbean Games
Central American and Caribbean Games